Henicopsaltria rufivelum, commonly known as the jungle grinder, is a large species of cicada native to northeastern Australia.

References

External links

Hemiptera of Australia
Insects described in 1978
Arenopsaltriini